Sandia View Academy is a private high school in Corrales, New Mexico. It is located in panoramic view of the Sandia Mountains. Sandia View Academy is a seven Albuquerque-area constituent church-run, grades 9 to 12, accredited senior high school in the Texico Conference of the Southwestern Union Conference of the Seventh-day Adventist Church. The school was founded in 1941 and has students from around the ABQ Metro area. Sandia View Academy is accredited through the State of New Mexico's Public Education Department (PED) for private schools, the Adventist Accrediting Association, and the National Association of Private Schools. The Adventist school system is a worldwide network and is recognized as the second-largest parochial school system in the world.

History
Sandia View Academy was established in 1939 as the Spanish-American Seminary and operated by the General Conference to train young men and women of Hispanic origin to serve as workers in the Spanish-speaking areas in the Canada and Latin American countries.
 
For a time the Spanish-American Seminary operated as a junior college. Spanish-speaking students from almost all the Latin-American countries enrolled, in addition to Hispanic-Americans from California, Colorado, Arizona, Texas, New York, and other areas of the United States.

This was one of four seminaries operated at various times by the church to serve special language groups. The other schools were Clinton Theological Seminary (German); Humpinson Theological Seminary (Danish and Norwegian); and Broadview Seminary (Swedish).
 
In 1951 the General Conference voted to turn the Spanish-American Seminary property and buildings over to the Texico Conference for adoption as the conference secondary boarding school.

In 2010 the property was sold and plans were made to build a new school in Rio Rancho, New Mexico.

Religious aspects
Sandia View Academy is a Seventh-day Adventist school. All students take religion classes each year that they are enrolled. These classes cover topics in biblical history and Christian and denominational doctrines. Students often converse with staff about real life and spirituality.  Staff pray with students and provide applicable advice.  Students are encouraged to find their personal walk with Christ through the Bible.

Academics
Sandia View Academy is a college preparatory school and seeks students who are committed to growing academically, spiritually, physically, and socially. The required honors level curriculum includes classes in the following subject areas: Religion, English, Social Studies, Communication/Business,  Physical Education, Health, Computer Science, Fine Arts, and Electives.

Sports
The school has soccer, basketball, volleyball and gymnastics for students. There are out-of-state University sports trips for Gymnastics-Acrofest and for Basketball-Hoops Classic Tournament

Trips
Trips enhance and extend the education opportunities at Sandia View Academy.  Current trip opportunities include local trips such as a week long Biology Outdoor Trip, Senior Survival, and field trips as well as out-of-state University trips such as Leadership Camp, University Experience, Music Festival, and Brain Games.  Students must maintain grades to be eligible for trips.

See also
 List of Seventh-day Adventist secondary schools
 Seventh-day Adventist education

References

External links

Buildings and structures in Sandoval County, New Mexico
Private high schools in New Mexico
Adventist secondary schools in the United States